Hollmann is a German surname. Notable people with the surname include:

Birgit Hollmann (born 1973), German cyclist
Friedrich von Hollmann (1842–1913), Admiral of the German Imperial Navy and Secretary of the German Imperial Naval Office
Hans Hollmann (1899–1960), German electronic specialist who made several breakthroughs in the development of radar
Mark Hollmann, American composer and lyricist
Natty Hollmann (1939–2021), Argentine philanthropist and humanitarian
Otakar Hollmann (1894–1967), Czech left-hand pianist
Reiner Hollmann (born 1949), German former football player and now manager
Silvia Hollmann (born 1955), retired West German hurdler
Torge Hollmann (born 1982), German football player

German-language surnames